A list of films produced by the Marathi language film industry based in Maharashtra in the year 1987.

1987 Releases
A list of Marathi films released in 1987.

References

Lists of 1987 films by country or language
 Marathi
1987